Dibromomethane or methylene bromide, or methylene dibromide is a halomethane with the formula CH2Br2. It is slightly soluble in water but very soluble in organic solvents.  It is a colorless liquid.

Preparation
Dibromomethane is prepared commercially from dichloromethane via bromochloromethane:
6 CH2Cl2  + 3 Br2  + 2 Al  →  6 CH2BrCl  +  2 AlCl3
CH2Cl2  + HBr  →  CH2BrCl  +  HCl
The latter route requires aluminium trichloride as a catalyst.
The bromochloromethane product from either reaction can further react in a similar manner:
6 CH2BrCl  + 3 Br2  + 2 Al  →  6 CH2Br2  +  2 AlCl3
CH2BrCl  + HBr  →  CH2Br2  +  HCl

In the laboratory, it is prepared from bromoform using sodium arsenite and sodium hydroxide: 
CHBr3 + Na3AsO3 + NaOH → CH2Br2 + Na3AsO4 + NaBr

Another way is to prepare it from diiodomethane and bromine.

Uses
Dibromomethane is used as a solvent, gauge fluid, and in organic synthesis (often as 1H-NMR internal standard).  It is a convenient agent for converting catechols to their methylenedioxy derivatives.

Natural occurrence
It is naturally produced by marine algae and liberated to the oceans. Releasing on soil causes it to evaporate and leach into the ground. Releasing in water causes it to be lost mainly by volatilisation with a half life of 5.2 hours. It has no significant degradation biological or abiological effects. In the atmosphere it will be lost because of reaction with photochemically produced hydroxyl radicals. The estimated half life of this reaction is 213 days.

References

External links
 

Bromoalkanes
Halomethanes
Refrigerants